Mwai Kumwenda  (born 27 September 1989) is a Malawi netball international player. She represented Malawi at the 2010, 2014 and 2018 Commonwealth Games and at the 2011 and 2015 Netball World Cups. Kumwenda was the top goal scorer at three successive major tournaments – the 2014 Commonwealth Games, the 2015 Netball World Cup and the 2018 Commonwealth Games. At the 2015 Netball World Cup she was also named Player of the Tournament. Kumwenda captained Malawi and was again tournament top scorer when they finished third at the 2016 Fast5 Netball World Series. At club level Kumwenda has played for Peninsula Waves in the Victorian Netball League, Victorian Fury in the Australian Netball League, Mainland Tactix in the ANZ Championship and for Melbourne Vixens in Suncorp Super Netball.

Early life and family
Kumwenda is the daughter of Kennedy and Costa Kumwenda. She was raised in Mtwalo, a village in the Mzimba District. She is the youngest of eight siblings. She is a Tumbuka by tribe and her name "Mwai" means "Lucky" in English. She has three brothers and three sisters.  A fourth sister passed away and her father, Kennedy, died when she was young. She began playing netball in primary school. Kumwenda later described her early experiences playing the game. "For balls, we used plastic bags and put them under the fire to melt, then moulded them with our hands and tied them with string. For the goal posts, we cut down trees, like the ones outside. The goal rings were made from old tyres, like the ones on cars". 
She continued playing netball in secondary school and came to the attention of Griffin Sayenda, the Malawi national netball team coach. When Kumwenda was just fifteen, and with the encouragement of Sayenda, she moved to Blantyre to pursue a netball career.

Playing career

Escom Sisters
In Malawi, Kumwenda played for Escom Sisters. They were later renamed Kukoma Diamonds. While playing in Australia and New Zealand, Kumwenda has also played for the Sisters and/or Diamonds on return visits to Malawi.

Peninsula Waves
Between 2011 and 2013 Kumwenda played for Peninsula Waves in the Victorian Netball League. While playing for Malawi at the 2009 Netball World Youth Cup, Kumwenda came to the attention of Waves coach, Maxine Wauchope. She was subsequently invited to play for Waves but, due to visa complications, she did not arrive at the club until 2011. In 2012 she shared the league's MVP award, the Margaret Caldow Trophy, with Helen Barclay and Caitlyn Strachan. She helped Waves reach the 2013 VNL grand final. Kumwenda returned to play for Waves during the 2017 season.

Victorian Fury
In 2013, together with Elle Bennetts, Kate Moloney and Fiona Themann, Kumwenda was a member of the Victorian Fury team that won the Australian Netball League title. She was the top goalscorer for Fury, finishing the season with a record 461 goals. In the grand final against NSW Waratahs she scored 38 goals with a 97% strike rate. She was subsequently named both the Fury and ANL MVP for 2013.

Mainland Tactix
Between 2014 and 2016 Kumwenda played for Mainland Tactix in the ANZ Championship. She replaced Joanne Harten as Tactix's import player. In 2014 she finished the season as ANZ Championship top scorer and she was also named the ANZ Championship Best New Talent.  In 2016 she was named the Tactix MVP.

Melbourne Vixens
In 2016 Kumwenda signed for Melbourne Vixens of Suncorp Super Netball. On 29 July 2018, during a Round 13 match against West Coast Fever, Kumwenda ruptured her anterior cruciate ligament. Kumwenda missed the early part of the 2019 season but made a comeback against Fever in Round 11. She was subsequently re-signed by Vixens for the 2020 season.

Malawi
In April 2008 Kumwenda played for Malawi in an away series against England. In August 2009 she was tournament top scorer at the 2009 Netball World Youth Cup. She subsequently represented Malawi at the 2010, 2014 and 2018 Commonwealth Games and at the 2011 and 2015 Netball World Cups. Kumwenda was the top goal scorer at three successive major tournaments – the 2014 Commonwealth Games, the 2015 Netball World Cup, and the 2018 Commonwealth Games. At the 2015 Netball World Cup she was also named Player of the Tournament. At the 2018 Commonwealth Games she scored 41 goals as she helped Malawi defeat New Zealand 57–53. 
Kumwenda captained Malawi and was again tournament top scorer when they finished third at the 2016 Fast5 Netball World Series.

Kumwenda missed the 2014 and 2017 Fast5 Netball World Series tournaments following disputes with the Netball Association of Malawi. These disputes have resulted in interventions by Grace Chiumia, Malawi's Minister of Sports. Kumnenda missed the 2019 Netball World Cup because of injury.

Honours
Melbourne Vixens
Suncorp Super Netball
Winners: 2020
Victorian Fury
Australian Netball League
Winners: 2013
Individual Awards

Notes
  Various sources also spell Kumwenda's first name as either Mwawi or Mwayi. On her Facebook and Instagram accounts she uses Mwai.
  Some sources suggest that Mwai (b. 1989) and Bridget Kumwenda (b. 1991) are sisters. However in interviews Mwai Kumwenda has stated she is the youngest sibling in her family. None of the interviews mention Bridget being a sister.

References 

1989 births
Living people
Malawian netball players
ANZ Championship players
Suncorp Super Netball players
Victorian Netball League players
Australian Netball League players
Melbourne Vixens players
Mainland Tactix players
Victorian Fury players
Netball players at the 2010 Commonwealth Games
Netball players at the 2014 Commonwealth Games
Netball players at the 2018 Commonwealth Games
Commonwealth Games competitors for Malawi
2011 World Netball Championships players
2015 Netball World Cup players